Season two of the American television music competition show The X Factor premiered on Fox on September 12, 2012, and ended on December 20, 2012.

Based on the UK format, the competition consists of auditions, in front of producers and then the judges with a live audience; bootcamp; judges' houses and then the live finals. Auditions for the show began in May 2012 and concluded in July 2012. The show is hosted by reality star Khloé Kardashian and Extra host Mario Lopez, replacing Steve Jones from the previous year. Simon Cowell and L.A. Reid returned as judges, while Paula Abdul and Nicole Scherzinger were replaced by Britney Spears and Demi Lovato.

Judges and hosts

On January 9, 2012, Fox announced that The X Factor would undergo some changes for its second season. On January 30, it was confirmed that host Steve Jones and judges Nicole Scherzinger and Paula Abdul would not be returning for the second season. Following Scherzinger's departure, she transferred to the UK show to replace Kelly Rowland as a judge for the 2012 UK series. On February 6, Simon Cowell and L.A. Reid were the only confirmed judges for season 2. Prior to her death, Whitney Houston was approached as a potential replacement judge. It was also reported that Cowell was in talks with Britney Spears for her to join the show, reportedly offering her $15 million. On May 9, reports surfaced that Spears officially signed on to judge the show. It was also rumored that Demi Lovato and Miley Cyrus were in talks to be the second replacement judge. Lovato reportedly signed the deal on May 13, making her the youngest ever X Factor judge. The following day, it was officially confirmed that Spears and Lovato would join The X Factor as the two newest judges. When asked about the new judges, Cowell said:

On June 26, 2012, Cowell confirmed that in his search for a new host he had narrowed the possibilities to five candidates. On June 29, Cowell revealed that there would be one male and one female host, and neither of them had hosted before. People considered for hosting slots included Stacy Keibler, Mario Lopez, Khloé Kardashian, Kelly Osbourne, Terrence J, Erin Andrews, and Mike Catherwood. It was also reported that Glee star Kevin McHale was in talks for the male hosting position. According to then-recent reports, Kardashian, McHale, and Nick Jonas were the front runners to host the show. On October 15, 2012, it was officially confirmed by E! News that Kardashian had officially signed on as co-host for the show, with Lopez close to signing a deal and was later confirmed as co-host the next day.

Irish music manager and The X Factor UK judge Louis Walsh filled in for Cowell at the Kansas City auditions while Cowell was recovering from bronchitis. On August 27, it was reported that Nick Jonas had signed a deal to help Lovato at judges' houses. It was later reported that Justin Bieber would be helping Reid, Marc Anthony helping Cowell, and will.i.am helping Spears.

This was the final season to feature L.A. Reid as a judge, after he announced that he was quitting the show in order to concentrate on other projects.

Selection process

Auditions

The producers' auditions began on March 14, 2012 at the Sprint Center in Kansas City, Missouri. More producers' auditions were held on March 22 at the Frank Erwin Center in Austin, Texas, April 20 at the Cow Palace in San Francisco, California, May 1 at the  Greensboro Coliseum in Greensboro, North Carolina and concluded on May 10 at the Dunkin' Donuts Center in Providence, Rhode Island.

The judges' auditions took place between May and July. The auditions went without a host as they had yet to hire new hosts by the time auditions started.

Bootcamp
Filming for bootcamp was held on July 25–27, 2012 in Miami. As with the auditions, there were no hosts at bootcamp.

120 contestants made it to the Bootcamp stage. At bootcamp the contestants had to perform two tasks. Task 1 involved the contestants had to sing solo, after which the judges eliminated half of the acts, bringing the total down to 60. In Task 2 the contestants were paired up to perform together. After Task 2 the judges narrowed down the acts to the 24 who progress on to the Judges's homes round.

The groups Fifth Harmony, Playback, and LYRIC 145 were formed from eliminated contestants from the Teens, Young Adults and Groups categories in bootcamp.  Fifth Harmony was known as LYLAS at this stage; their name was changed after they made the top 16 when a group consisting of four of Bruno Mars' sisters, called "The Lylas", claimed the show stole their name. Their name changed again for the Top 13 performances, as their mentor Simon Cowell was not in favor of the name 1432 and felt that the show's viewers could make a better name for the group.

Judges' houses
The judges' houses was filmed September 28 & 29, 2012. The judges received news of their categories from the producers by telephone, seen during the third bootcamp episode on October 10. Reid mentored the over 25s in Beverly Hills, California, assisted by Justin Bieber, accompanied by his manager Scooter Braun; Cowell took the groups to Miami Beach, Florida with Latin singer Marc Anthony, Spears had the teens in Malibu, California with The Black Eyed Peas member and The Voice UK coach will.i.am, and Lovato had the young adults in Los Angeles, with Jonas Brothers member Nick Jonas.

{| class="wikitable plainrowheaders"
|+Summary of judges' houses
|-
! Judge
! Category
! Location
! Assistant(s)
! Acts Eliminated
|-
!scope="row"|Cowell
| Groups
| Miami Beach, Florida
| Marc Anthony
| Dope CrisisPlayback
|-
!scope="row"| Lovato
| Young Adults
| Los Angeles, California
| Nick Jonas
| Jillian JensenNick Youngerman
|-
!scope="row"|Reid
| Over 25s
| Beverly Hills, California
| Justin BieberScooter Braun
| Daryl BlackTara Simon
|-
!scope="row"| Spears
| Teens
| Malibu, California
| will.i.am
| Reed DemingJames Tanner
|}

Acts
The top sixteen acts were confirmed as follows;

Key:
 – Winner
 – Runner-Up

Live shows 
The live shows began on October 31, 2012. This was the debut episode for Lopez and Kardashian as hosts on the show. Each week, the contestants performed on Wednesday, with the voting lines opening after the performances. As with previous season, each live show has a different theme. The live final took place on December 19 and 20. A recording of "Live and Let Die" by The X Factor UK series five winner Alexandra Burke featured on the second week of live shows.

Each results show featured musical performances from at least two artists. There was no guest performer on the first result show. The second results show featured two performances from The X Factor UK series seven finalist One Direction, while Taylor Swift performed on the third result show.The X Factor UK series seven finalist Cher Lloyd and Becky G performed on the fourth results show. Week five included the premiering of a music video by will.i.am featuring judge Spears and performances from season one runner-up Josh Krajcik and Alicia Keys. Season one winner Melanie Amaro and Kesha performed on the sixth week. The semi-final results show featured performances from Bruno Mars and Bridgit Mendler. One Direction performed again in the final, and Pitbull also performed. This was the only season to feature the leaderboard which reveals which act has the most votes.

Results summary

Color key

  There was no public vote in the first week. Each mentor selected two acts from their own category to advance to the second week and the two remaining acts as the bottom two. The bottom two acts performed another song of their choice in the sing-off and their mentor was required to eliminate one of the bottom two acts they selected.
  White returned to the competition in week two because the judges felt that she should not have been eliminated in week one.

Live show details

Week 1 (October 31/November 1)
 Theme: Songs by American artists (billed as "Made in America")

 There was no public vote in the first week. Each mentor selected two finalists from their own category as the bottom two. The bottom two acts performed another song of their choice in a sing-off and their mentor was required to eliminate one of them based on the performance.

Judges' decisions to eliminate
 Lovato: Willie Jones – gave no reason
 Reid: David Correy – gave no reason
 Spears: Diamond White – gave no reason
 Cowell: Sister C – gave no reason

Week 2 (November 7/8)
 Theme: Songs from movies
 Musical guest: One Direction ("Live While We're Young" and "Little Things")

One of the four acts that did not face the public vote in week one and was eliminated by mentor was reinstated to the show as the judges felt that the act should not have been eliminated in the previous week. The reinstated act was announced as Diamond White at the start of the season's second live show. 1432 being known as Fifth Harmony started in week two.

Judges' votes to eliminate
 Lovato: Jason Brock – backed her own act, CeCe Frey.
 Reid: Cece Frey – backed his own act, Jason Brock.
 Spears: CeCe Frey – gave no reason.
 Cowell: Jason Brock – gave no reason.

With the acts in the bottom two receiving two votes each, the result went to deadlock and reverted to the earlier public vote. Brock was eliminated as the act with the fewest public votes.

Week 3 (November 14/15)
 Theme: Divas
 Musical guest: Taylor Swift ("State of Grace")

Starting from week three, two acts were eliminated from each results show until the quarter-final. The three acts with the fewest public votes were announced and then the act with the fewest votes was automatically eliminated. The remaining two acts then performed in the final showdown and face the judges' votes.

Judges' votes to eliminate
 Reid: Jennel Garcia – gave no reason.
 Spears: Jennel Garcia – gave no reason.
 Lovato: Paige Thomas – gave no reason but after the show in an interview, she felt that Garcia "was more talented" despite Thomas having "more star quality".
 Cowell: Jennel Garcia – stated he had an "easy decision" and felt that Thomas had "the best star potential" after watching her final showdown performance.

After Reid and Spears voted against Garcia, Lopez asked Cowell for his vote. Cowell stated he wanted Lovato to vote before him. Lopez attempted to persuade Cowell to vote before Lovato, but Cowell insisted on Lovato voting before him. As a result, Lopez asked Lovato to vote before Cowell. The second before Lovato appeared to give her response, she pushed Cowell to vote before her as he was asked first but Lopez told Lovato the show was pressed for time and Cowell objected. Lovato voted against Thomas and then Cowell voted against Garcia. In an interview after the show, Cowell already intended to vote against Garcia and persisted to have Lovato vote before him because he knew if he voted before Lovato that she would not have to vote, was curious as to who Lovato wanted to stay and thought the audience wanted to know who Lovato was going to vote against.

However, voting statistics revealed that Garcia received more votes than Thomas which meant that if the result went to deadlock, Garcia would have been saved.

Week 4 (November 21/22)
 Theme: Thanksgiving
 Group performance: "Fix You" (with Bancroft Middle School choir)
 Musical guests: Cher Lloyd featuring Becky G ("Oath")

Judges' votes to eliminate
 Lovato: Beatrice Miller – gave no reason, though effectively backed their own act, CeCe Frey.
 Spears: CeCe Frey – gave no reason, though effectively backed her own act, Beatrice Miller.
 Reid: Beatrice Miller – gave no reason.
 Cowell: Beatrice Miller – thought the competition was "all getting too much for" Miller and that the then-present time was not "the right time for" her.

However, voting statistics revealed that Miller received more votes than Frey which meant that if Cowell sent the result to deadlock, Miller would have been saved.

Week 5 (November 28/29)
 Theme: Number-ones
 Musical guests: Josh Krajcik ("One Thing She’ll Never Know") and Alicia Keys ("Girl on Fire")
 Music video premiere: will.i.am featuring Britney Spears ("Scream & Shout")

Judges' votes to eliminate
 Reid: Diamond White – backed his own act, Vino Alan.
 Spears: Vino Alan – backed her own act, Diamond White.
 Lovato: Vino Alan – gave no reason.
 Cowell: Vino Alan – gave no reason.

Week 6: Quarter-Final (December 5/6)
 Themes: Unplugged songs; Pepsi Challenge songs
 Musical guests: Melanie Amaro ("Long Distance") and Kesha ("C'Mon")

For the first time this season, each act performed two songs. The list of song choices for the Pepsi Challenge was released via Twitter on December 1, 2012.

Judges' votes to eliminate
 Cowell: Diamond White – gave no reason, though effectively backed his own act, Fifth Harmony.
 Spears: Fifth Harmony – gave no reason, though effectively backed her own act, Diamond White.
 Reid: Diamond White – gave no reason.
 Lovato: Diamond White – gave no reason.

Week 7: Semi-Final (December 12/13)
 Themes: Contestant's choice; "songs to get you to the final" (no theme)
 Group performance: "Coming Home" / "Coming Home, Pt. II" 
 Musical guests: Bridgit Mendler ("Ready or Not") and Bruno Mars ("Locked Out of Heaven")

The semi-final did not feature a final showdown nor a leaderboard. Instead the act with the fewest public votes, Emblem3, were automatically eliminated.

Week 8: Final (December 19/20)
The final consisted of two two-hour episodes on December 19 and 20.

December 19
 Themes: Favorite performance (billed as "song of the season"); celebrity duets; winner's song (billed as "$5 million song")
 Group performance: "You Are Not Alone" (all top 13 contestants; in dedication to the Sandy Hook Elementary School shooting victims) 

December 20
 Theme: Christmas songs
 Group performances: "All You Need Is Love" and "The Climb" (performed by Carly Rose Sonenclar and Tate Stevens)
 Musical guests: Pitbull ("Don't Stop the Party" / "Feel This Moment") and One Direction ("Kiss You")

Contestants who Appeared on Other Seasons or Shows
 Arin Ray competed in Season 1 as a member of InTENsity, who were eliminated in 12th place.
 Jeff Gutt auditioned again in Season 3.  He was the runner-up of the third season.
 Fifth Harmony members Normani and Ally Brooke competed on the 24th and 28th seasons of Dancing with the Stars, respectively.  Both finished in 3rd place in their respective seasons.
 Diamond White later found success as a voice actor, starring in shows such as Transformers: Rescue Bots and The Lion Guard.
 Jillian Jensen auditioned for Season 13 of American Idol. She made it to the Top 30.

Famous Relations
 Sophie Tweed-Simmons, who was cut during the Boot Camp round, is the daughter of Gene Simmons and Shannon Tweed.

Reception

U.S. Nielsen ratings 

Notes

Controversy

Broadcast interruption of judges' houses
During the airing of the judges' houses episode on October 17, the show was stopped abruptly in the middle of Lovato's selection for the top 16 and cut immediately to a game of the National League Championship Series. This was due to the fact that the game was halted and rescheduled later in the day due to a rain delay, to be played concurrently with The X Factor. Between the two, Fox decided to air the game instead of the rest of the episode. Many viewers took to the internet and called Fox to complain about the interruption. Cowell even took to his Twitter to comment that: "It's what's known as a total f up." The show instead aired the following week in its entirety.

"Rejected" votes of Paige Thomas
During the fifth live show in November, many voters reported of having their votes "rejected" and their calls cut off when attempting to vote for Paige Thomas; Thomas was eliminated the following night. Fox and The X Factor affiliates have not confirmed or denied whether this had anything to do with Thomas' subsequent elimination the following night.

Don Philip audition
In the season two premiere, Don Philip, who once collaborated with Britney Spears on her debut album, auditioned in front of the judges, and received a "no" from all judges. He then told Access Hollywood that ten minutes of footage from the interview was edited out because he felt like the judges bullied him into revealing that he is gay. Spears reportedly replied "I think it’s fine you’re gay," though this was edited out as well. Fox then released a statement saying:

"The judges were not given any information at all about Mr. Philip prior to his audition. The personal information that Mr. Philip quickly volunteered at the start of his audition was a surprise to the judges, who asked what had happened during the past 10 years, as they were interested in Mr. Philip’s career. While we understand his decision to discuss his personal life, Mr. Philip’s sexual orientation was not something that any of the judges or producers felt was relevant to this audition. When advertising and promoting open auditions, thousands of people are informed about the ways to enter the show. Mr. Philip himself chose to enter for a chance to win a five million dollar recording contract."

Later that year, an insider revealed that he was contacted specifically by producers because of his association with Spears, and that according to him, "she already knew he was going to be there, of course, because this is a reality show".

References

External links
 Official website

Season 2
2012 American television seasons
United States 02